Hon. George W. Hayes (1847–1933) was a slave, the first black court crier in Cincinnati,  Hamilton County, Ohio, and a state legislator. He served in the Ohio House of Representatives from 1902 to 1905. He had African American and Native American heritage and was enslaved early in his life.

Hayes married Mamie Forte in 1874 and they had five children. He later served three terms in the Ohio General Assembly, as a Republican. He and his family were members of the Union Baptist Church, Cincinnati. Hayes Elementary School in Cincinnati is named for him.

He is buried in the Union Baptist Cemetery in the Price Hill neighborhood of Cincinnati.

See also
African-American officeholders during and following the Reconstruction era

References

External links
Photographs of African-American members of the Ohio House of Representatives
Union Baptist Church
Letter from George W. Hays to Jere Brown

Politicians from Cincinnati
Republican Party members of the Ohio House of Representatives
1847 births
1933 deaths
African-American men in politics